The College of Osteopaths is a charitable trust that dates from 1948 and provides training leading to a Bachelor of Osteopathy or a Master of Osteopathy degree. The course is designed in part-time mode for the full five years.  Lectures take place at the weekends allowing students to continue with full time work until they complete their training.  It is validated by Staffordshire University.  Uniquely, the course is offered in two locations in the United Kingdom; Borehamwood in Hertfordshire and Stoke-on-Trent, Staffordshire. The program has been accredited with Recognised Qualification status (RQ) by the national statutory regulatory body The General Osteopathic Council (GOsC).

The College operates 3 teaching clinics where osteopathic treatment is offered to all members of the local community at a subsidised rate.  Clinics are based in Borehamwood, Hertfordshire; Marylebone, London and Hartshill, Stoke-on-Trent.  Treatment is provided and managed by senior students.  All students attend clinic from year 1.

The College of Osteopaths also offers a three year fast-track pathway for health professionals such as physiotherapists or doctors who wish to qualify in osteopathy.

See also
 List of osteopathic colleges
 Osteopathy

External links 
Official College of Osteopaths website

Education in Hertfordshire
Universities and colleges in England
Osteopathic colleges in the United Kingdom